Ischnodemus falicus is a species of true bug in the family Blissidae. It is found in North America.

References

Further reading

 
 
 

Blissidae
Insects described in 1832